The discography of Swedish indie pop band Miike Snow consists of three studio albums, two extended plays (EPs), eleven singles (including one as a featured artist), fifteen music videos, and ten remixes for other artists. Formed in Stockholm in 2007, the band consists of Christian Karlsson and Pontus Winnberg of production duo Bloodshy & Avant and American vocalist Andrew Wyatt. The band began by sharing tracks and remixes on the free music website RCRD LBL that proved successful in the music blogosphere. The act preserved its anonymity by using a silhouetted jackalope avatar before revealing itself as a three-man band. The band released the debut studio album Miike Snow (2009) through Downtown Records to favorable reviews from music critics. The album spawned three commercial singles, two of which—"Animal" and "Black & Blue"—had moderate impact on charts in Belgium and the United Kingdom in 2009. The debut single "Animal" subsequently received a gold certification in the United States.

Following a collaboration with Italian duo Crookers with the single "Remedy" (2010), Miike Snow completed its second studio album Happy to You (2012). While the band described the debut record as "a bunch of songs that ended up on an album", Happy to You was the result of the band being able to carefully map out the process. The album was released in March 2012 to positive reviews from critics. It peaked in the top 50 in Australia, Denmark, Sweden, the UK, and the US, while its lead single "Paddling Out" was a top-40 hit in the Netherlands.

Following months of touring throughout 2012, the band decided to take a break to work on individual projects. Wyatt released his first solo album Descender (2013), Karlsson formed DJ duo Galantis, and Winnberg released the album Sky City (2015) with his band Amason. The trio revisited the Miike Snow project in 2014, and released the single "Heart Is Full" the next year. The band's third studio album iii (2016) was met with a generally favorable reception, and reached the top 50 in Australia, Canada, Sweden, and the US. iii second single "Genghis Khan" was a top-ten hit on the American Alternative Songs chart, and certified gold in Canada. In addition to three studio efforts, Miike Snow has also released two live EPs, iTunes Festival: London 2009 (2009) and Spotify Sessions (2016).

Studio albums

Extended plays

Singles

As lead artist

Promotional singles

As featured artist

Guest appearances

Remixes

Music videos

Notes

References

External links
 [ Miike Snow] discography at AllMusic
 
 

Discography
Discographies of Swedish artists
Rock music group discographies